A late-season tornado outbreak in the Southern United States affected the states of Louisiana, Mississippi, Alabama, and Georgia, from the afternoon of November 29 into the morning of November 30, 2022. The outbreak was the result of an intense upper-level trough that materialized over the aforementioned states where increased moisture, atmospheric instability, and elevated wind shear were present, creating conditions highly conducive to supercell thunderstorms. Multiple tornadic storms developed in the risk area, producing numerous tornadoes. Several of these tornadoes were strong and destructive, prompting the issuance of multiple PDS tornado warnings. Two low-end EF3 tornadoes caused severe damage near Clarks, Louisiana and Tibbie, Alabama respectively while the Flatwood and Willow Springs communities north of Montgomery, Alabama was struck by an EF2 tornado, which caused two fatalities. Numerous weaker tornadoes also touched down, including a high-end EF1 tornado that caused considerable damage in Eutaw, Alabama. In all, 25 tornadoes were confirmed.

Meteorological synopsis

A significant severe weather event was forecast multiple days in advance of the outbreak, as early models suggested the presence of multiple thunderstorm-enhancing atmospheric conditions over the northeast Ark-La-Tex regions, northwest Mississippi, and extreme southwestern Tennessee. On November 24, the Storm Prediction Center identified a "severe" threat for the aforementioned regions, although most of the highest risk was positioned over northern Louisiana.

As the days passed, and computer weather prediction models identified multiple thunderstorm-enhancing elements over the area, confidence grew in the probability of a severe weather outbreak occurring. On November 27, the SPC issued a Day 3 level 3/enhanced risk for the area, extending all the way through eastern Arkansas, and into western Tennessee. The outlook suggested that a progressive upper-level trough would pass over elevated instability in the area, which coupled  with a strong 50-70 kt low-level jet, and 400-500 m2/s2 helicity values, would create conditions conductive to supercell thunderstorm development. An additional damaging wind and hail threat was mentioned.

The threat level was upped to a level 4/moderate risk by the SPC on November 28. The main area of risk was shifted mainly to western Mississippi, extreme southeastern Arkansas, and northeastern Louisiana, where a 15% hatched risk for tornadoes was introduced, indicating the elevated probabilities for strong, long-tracked tornadoes to develop. There was even consideration for a level level 5/high risk upgrade, but due to uncertainty in where the highest risk would be, it was maintained at a moderate risk. The outlook highlighted the presence of greater instability than expected, aided by strong wind shear, and steep mid-level lapse rates, which would help in the sustainment of supercell structures, enhancing the tornado risk.

The next day, at 1300 UTC (8:00 am CDT), the SPC maintained the risk level, with some minor corrections to its coverage and 15% tornado risk placement. This outlook presented the presence of convective available potential energy (CAPE) values of 1000-2000 J/kg in the area, and with the previously stated rich moisture, shear, and helicity present in the area, conditions were primed for a tornado outbreak.

As the afternoon advanced, the SPC issued two rare PDS tornado watches encompassing large regions of Louisiana, southeastern Arkansas, and central Mississippi, as atmospheric conditions were very favorable for strong, long-track tornadoes. As the first storm popped up in central Mississippi, a powerful supercell developed in the outskirts of the main risk area, in Covington and Jefferson Davis counties, producing a damaging, multi-vortex tornado that tracked near the town of Bassfield, which was devastated by an EF4 tornado on April 12, 2020. Multiple other tornadoes were reported from this long-tracked supercell. As the afternoon progressed, multiple supercells developed in the main risk area, entering a highly favorable environment for maturing. A storm that developed in the southern edge of the main risk area produced multiple tornadoes, one of which was a large wedge tornado that injured several people in Caldwell Parish, Louisiana, resulting in a PDS tornado warning, only the second ever issued for the month of November. After the event, Andrew Lyons, a forecaster at the Storm Prediction Center, posted a tweet showing how the forecast verified on the Tornado Modified Practically Perfect Probs.

Confirmed tornadoes

November 29 event

November 30 event

Preparations and impact
Schools in each affected state canceled/postponed classes or closed early. Northwestern State University campuses in Louisiana also closed early and postponed or canceled classes. Multiple Mississippi school districts closed early on November 29 in anticipation of the inclement weather, including those of Claiborne, Copiah, Lawrence, and Madison counties. Shelton State Community College in Alabama closed its campus at 4:00 p.m. CST. The storm brought 18,000 power outages to Austin. Alabama recorded 35,000 power outages while Mississippi saw 6,800 power outages. Close to five inches of rain fell.

See also 

 List of North American tornadoes and tornado outbreaks
 Weather of 2022

Notes

References

External links
 The Weather Authority: Severe weather updates for November 29, 2022
 The Weather Authority: Severe weather updates for November 29, 2022 10PM
 The Weather Authority: Severe weather updates for November 30, 2022 1230AM

Tornadoes of 2022
2022 meteorology
F3 tornadoes
Tornadoes in Mississippi
Tornadoes in Louisiana
Tornadoes in Alabama
2022 in Mississippi
2022 in Louisiana
2022 in Alabama